David Nègre (born 30 November 1973) is a French former professional footballer who played as a forward. While with OGC Nice, he played 16 matches in Ligue 1, the top tier of French football. He also had a spell in Belgium with K.R.C. Gent-Zeehaven.

See also
Football in France
List of football clubs in France

References

1973 births
Living people
French footballers
Association football forwards
Stade Malherbe Caen players
FC Rouen players
FC Aurillac Arpajon Cantal Auvergne players
OGC Nice players
AS Cherbourg Football players
Rodez AF players
RCO Agde players
Ligue 1 players
Stade Beaucairois players
People from Aurillac
Sportspeople from Cantal
Footballers from Auvergne-Rhône-Alpes
K.R.C. Gent players